Eric Raybould (born 8 December 1940) is an English footballer who played as a wing half in the Football League for Chester.

References

Living people
1940 births
English footballers
Footballers from Manchester
Association football wing halves
English Football League players
Chester City F.C. players
Mossley A.F.C. players